Pez-e Sofla is a village in Zalaqi-ye Gharbi Rural District, Besharat District, Aligudarz County, Lorestan Province, Iran. At the 2006 census, its population was 135, in 26 families.

References 

Towns and villages in Aligudarz County